Benjamin Mitchell won the title, beating Luke Saville 5–7, 6–0, 6–1

Seeds

  John Millman (second round)
  Matthew Ebden (second round)
  Jordan Thompson (second round)
  Brydan Klein (second round)
  Luke Saville (final)
  Connor Smith (second round)
  Li Zhe (quarterfinals)
  Alex Bolt (quarterfinals)

Draw

Finals

Top half

Bottom half

References
 Main Draw
  Qualifying Draw

2015 ATP Challenger Tour
2015 in Australian tennis
2015